Kato Zodeia is a village on the island of Cyprus, east of Morphou. De facto, it is under the control of Northern Cyprus.

Green Line crossing
Kato Zodeia is the location of one of six Green Line crossings between the Republic of Cyprus and Northern Cyprus. The town on the Republic side of the border is Astromeritis. The crossing is only for vehicular traffic. It was opened on 31 August 2005.

References

Communities in Nicosia District
Populated places in Güzelyurt District
Border crossings of Cyprus
Greek Cypriot villages depopulated during the 1974 Turkish invasion of Cyprus